Henry Sims (born March 27, 1990) is an American professional basketball player for Ulsan Hyundai Mobis Phoebus of the Korean Basketball League (KBL). He played college basketball for Georgetown University.

High school career
Sims played for Mt. Saint Joseph High averaging 19 points and 13 rebounds as a senior. He led his team to three BCL and MIAA Championships and earned Player of the Year and All Metro honors.

College career
Sims played for four years at Georgetown where he played in 104 games, starting 17, averaging 3.8 points, 2.6 rebounds. He had his best year as a senior, averaging 11.6 points, 6.0 rebounds and 3.5 assists per game connecting on 46.3 percent of his field goals.

Professional career

Erie BayHawks (2012–2013)
After going undrafted in the 2012 NBA draft, Sims joined the Utah Jazz for the Orlando Summer League and Chicago Bulls for the Las Vegas Summer League. On September 10, 2012, he signed with the New York Knicks. However, he was waived on October 27. In November 2012, he was acquired by the Erie BayHawks.

On February 4, 2013, Sims was named to the Prospects All-Star roster for the 2013 NBA D-League All-Star Game.

New Orleans Hornets / Erie BayHawks / Petron Blaze Boosters (2013)
On March 3, 2013, Sims signed a 10-day contract with the New Orleans Hornets. He appeared in two games for the Hornets recording a total of four points and two rebounds. He was released by the Hornets on March 12, 2013 and returned to the BayHawks. On April 1, 2013, his contract was bought out by the BayHawks, and a day later, signed with the Petron Blaze Boosters of the Philippines.

Cleveland Cavaliers (2013–2014)
He joined the Charlotte Bobcats for the 2013 NBA Summer League. On September 30, 2013, he signed with the Cleveland Cavaliers. On December 5, 2013, he was assigned to the Canton Charge of the NBA D-League. He was recalled by the Cavaliers on December 9. On December 11, he was reassigned to Canton. He was recalled the next day.

Philadelphia 76ers (2014–2015)
On February 20, 2014, Sims was traded to the Philadelphia 76ers along with Earl Clark and two future second-round picks in exchange for Spencer Hawes. On March 22, 2014, Sims recorded 18 points and a career high 15 rebounds in an 81-91 loss to the Chicago Bulls. On April 4, 2014, Sims recorded a career high 24 points in a 111-102 win over the Boston Celtics.

Grand Rapids Drive (2015–2016)
On September 16, 2015, Sims signed with the Phoenix Suns. However, he was later waived by the Suns on October 24 after appearing in all six of the team's preseason games. On November 12, he was acquired by the Grand Rapids Drive of the NBA Development League. On November 14, he made his debut for Grand Rapids in a 113–101 win over the Delaware 87ers, recording 15 points, seven rebounds, one assist and one block in 19 minutes off the bench.

Brooklyn Nets (2016)
On March 17, 2016, Sims signed a 10-day contract with the Brooklyn Nets. Two days later, he made his debut in a 115–113 loss to the Detroit Pistons, recording 10 points, eight rebounds, one steal and one block in 20 minutes off the bench. On March 27, he signed a second 10-day contract with the Nets, and on April 6, he signed with the team for the rest of the season.

Salt Lake City Stars (2016)
On September 22, 2016, Sims signed with the Utah Jazz, but was waived on October 20 after appearing in three preseason games. On October 31, he was acquired by the Salt Lake City Stars of the NBA Development League. On December 12, Sims early terminated his contract with Salt Lake City. In 11 games, he averaged 18.2 points, 8.3 rebounds and 2.0 assists in 29.7 minutes.

Shanxi Brave Dragons (2016–2017)
On December 20, 2016, Sims signed with the Shanxi Brave Dragons of the Chinese Basketball Association.

Salt Lake City Stars (2017)
On February 27, 2017, Sims was acquired by the Salt Lake City Stars of the NBA Development League, returning to the franchise for a second stint.

Vanoli Cremona (2017–2018)
On August 15, 2017, Sims signed with Italian club Vanoli Cremona of the Lega Basket Serie A.

Virtus Roma (2018–2019)
Sims signed with Virtus Roma of the Italian second division on August 6, 2018.

Fortitudo Bologna (2019–2020)

On August 6, 2019, he has signed contract with Fortitudo Bologna of the Italian Lega Basket Serie A (LBA). Sims averaged 15.1 points and 8.9 rebounds per game. He opted out of his deal on July 7, 2020.

Incheon Electroland Elephants (2020–2021)
On July 8, 2020, Sims signed with the Incheon Electroland Elephants.

Reggio Emilia (2021)
On February 14, 2021 Sims returned to Italy and signed until the end of the season for Reggio Emilia of the Italian Lega Basket Serie A (LBA) that was also playing the FIBA Europe Cup. He left the team one match before the end of the regular season.

Universo Treviso (2021–2022)
On July 23, 2021, Sims signed with Universo Treviso.

Career statistics

NBA

Regular season

|-
| style="text-align:left;"| 
| style="text-align:left;"| New Orleans
| 2 || 0 || 2.5 || .667 || .000 || .000 || 1.0 || .0 || .0 || .0 || 2.0
|-
| style="text-align:left;"| 
| style="text-align:left;"| Cleveland
| 20 || 0 || 8.4 || .400 || .000 || .571 || 2.8 || .3 || .3 || .4 || 2.2
|-
| style="text-align:left;"| 
| style="text-align:left;"| Philadelphia
| 26 || 25 || 27.2 || .489 || .000 || .766 || 7.0 || 1.8 || .9 || .5 || 11.8
|-
| style="text-align:left;"| 
| style="text-align:left;"| Philadelphia
| 73 || 32 || 19.2 || .474 || .182 || .774 || 4.9 || 1.1 || .5 || .4 || 8.0
|-
| style="text-align:left;"| 
| style="text-align:left;"| Brooklyn
| 14 || 4 || 18.8 || .429 || .000 || .833 || 5.1 || .6 || .6 || 1.0 || 6.5
|-
| style="text-align:left;"| Career
| style="text-align:left;"|
| 135 || 61 || 18.8 || .471 || .174 || .767 || 5.0 || 1.0 || .6 || .5 || 7.6

PBA

|-
| align="left" | 2012–13
| align="left" | Petron Blaze
| 6 || 38.8 || .455 || .000 || .721 || 15.7 || 1.0 || 1.0 || 2.3 || 22.8
|-
| align="left" | Career
| align="left" |
| 6 || 38.8 || .455 || .000 || .721 || 15.7 || 1.0 || 1.0 || 2.3 || 22.8

Personal life
Sims is the son of Brenda and Henry Sims Sr., and the step-son of Terry Awkward. He has four siblings, Myra Moore, Karigan Awkward, Brandon Awkward, and Datren Awkward.

References

External links

Official website
Henry Sims D-League stats
Henry Sims college stats

1990 births
Living people
21st-century African-American sportspeople
African-American basketball players
American expatriate basketball people in Italy
American expatriate basketball people in South Korea
American expatriate basketball people in the Philippines
American men's basketball players
Basketball players from Baltimore
Brooklyn Nets players
Canton Charge players
Centers (basketball)
Cleveland Cavaliers players
Erie BayHawks (2008–2017) players
Grand Rapids Drive players
Georgetown Hoyas men's basketball players
Lega Basket Serie A players
New Orleans Hornets players
Parade High School All-Americans (boys' basketball)
Philadelphia 76ers players
Philippine Basketball Association imports
Power forwards (basketball)
Salt Lake City Stars players
San Miguel Beermen players
Shanxi Loongs players
Undrafted National Basketball Association players
Universo Treviso Basket players
Vanoli Cremona players